The 1950–51 Minneapolis Lakers season was the franchise's third season in the National Basketball Association (NBA). In 1950–51, the NBA reduced the number of teams to 11. The two-time defending champion Lakers continued to dominate by winning the Western Division with a 44–24 record. In the playoffs, the Lakers needed three games to eliminate the Indianapolis Olympians in the first round. In the Western Finals, the Lakers took Game 1, but were ultimately defeated for the championship by the Rochester Royals, who came back to win the next three games.

Off-season

NBA Draft

Regular season

Standings

Record vs. opponents

Game log

Player stats
Note: GP= Games played; REB= Rebounds; AST= Assists; STL = Steals; BLK = Blocks; PTS = Points; AVG = Average

Playoffs

|- align="center" bgcolor="#ccffcc"
| 1
| March 21
| Indianapolis
| W 95–81
| George Mikan (41)
| Minneapolis Auditorium
| 1–0
|- align="center" bgcolor="#ffcccc"
| 2
| March 23
| @ Indianapolis
| L 88–108
| Vern Mikkelsen (30)
| Butler Fieldhouse
| 1–1
|- align="center" bgcolor="#ccffcc"
| 3
| March 25
| Indianapolis
| W 85–80
| George Mikan (30)
| Minneapolis Auditorium
| 2–1
|-

|- align="center" bgcolor="#ccffcc"
| 1
| March 29
| Rochester
| W 76–73
| Vern Mikkelsen (23)
| Minneapolis Auditorium
| 1–0
|- align="center" bgcolor="#ffcccc"
| 2
| March 31
| Rochester
| L 66–70
| Jim Pollard (20)
| Minneapolis Auditorium
| 1–1
|- align="center" bgcolor="#ffcccc"
| 3
| April 1
| @ Rochester
| L 70–83
| George Mikan (23)
| Edgerton Park Arena
| 1–2
|- align="center" bgcolor="#ffcccc"
| 4
| April 3
| @ Rochester
| L 75–80
| George Mikan (32)
| Edgerton Park Arena
| 1–3
|-

Awards and honors
George Mikan, All-NBA First Team
Vern Mikkelsen, All-NBA Second Team
George Mikan, NBA All-Star Game
Vern Mikkelsen, NBA All-Star Game
Jim Pollard, NBA All-Star Game

Transactions

References
General
Lakers on Database Basketball
Lakers on Basketball Reference

Specific

Los Angeles Lakers seasons
Minneapolis Lakers seasons
Minnesota Lakers
Minnesota Lakers